Fahim Gul (born 12 August 1956) is a former Pakistani professional squash player.

Fahim Gul was born in Rawalpindi. He is the brother of Rahim Gul and Jamshed Gul, two former world ranked players. He represented Pakistan during the 1979 World Team Squash Championships.

References

External links
 

Pakistani male squash players
1956 births
Living people
Cricketers from Rawalpindi
20th-century Pakistani people